Aladin & Alakadam is an Indonesian soap opera produced by Lunar Film. It first aired on ANTV on October 29, 2016.

Synopsis 
Aladin and Alakadam tells about a child orphan named Aladin or commonly called Ali (Cole Gribble). Aladin 2 junior high school in grade and lived with his mother, who was a baker named Umi Atikah (Sisca Magdalena).

Keseruan Meet Fans quiz program in Yogyakarta
One time, Aladin was taken to a creepy old house by a neighbor named Farel (Mike Michael). Farel known as someone who always disturb neighbors Aladin and mock the simplicity of Aladin.

In the old house, Aladdin find a lamp cepor Jin Alakadam (Ali Mensan) surrounded. Aladin is beginning to figure Jin fear Alakadam big man slowly began receiving Jin Alakadam for acting funny and childish. Because it has been freed from prison cempor lights, Alakadam feel indebted to Aladin. They help each other face the people who intend evil against them.

Alakadam must escape-mistiness avoid enemies that Burak (Jon Mini) and Burik (Ivan Mini), jin bald berkuncung which is the messenger of King Jin. King Jin wants Alakadam brought back to the kingdom of Jin's marriage to her daughter, Princess Lolady (Rima Shepherd), which has a great body and greatly admired Alakadam. In addition, Alakadam also must deal with Emil (Ginanjar) and Kamil (Sumaisy Djaitov Yanda), two thieves were always intending to steal the contents of the house Alakadam.

Cast 
 Cole Gribble as Young Aladin/Ali
 Ali Mensan as Alakadam
 Mike Michael as Farel
 Sisca Magdalena as Atikah
 Jon Mini as Burak
 Ivan Mini as Burik
 Ryma Gembala as Lolady
 Ginanjar as Emil
 Sumaisy Djaitov Yanda as Kamil
 Shaheer Sheikh as Aladdin
 Vin Rana as Purab Khanna
 Clay Gribble as Clay

References

External links 
 

Indonesian television soap operas
2016 Indonesian television series debuts